Del Rey (Spanish for "of the King") is a  neighborhood in the Westside of Los Angeles, surrounded on three sides by Culver City, California. Within it lie a police station, the largest public housing complex on the Westside, a public middle school and six public elementary schools. It is served by a neighborhood council and a residents association. Del Rey, with a 32,000+ population, has a large number of military veterans.

Geography

According to the Mapping L.A. project of the Los Angeles Times, Del Rey is surrounded on the northwest, north, northeast and east by Culver City,  on the southeast by Playa Vista, on the southwest and west by Marina del Rey and on the northwest by Venice. Its southern bound touches the northeast corner of Playa del Rey and a small unincorporated residential area called Alsace.

Street and other boundaries are: the Culver City line on the northwest, and northeast, Ballona Creek and Centinela Creek on the southeast and Lincoln Boulevard on the southwest.

It is further divided into 8 census tracts that form the Del Rey Neighborhood Council's Areas A through H.

History
The neighborhood was developed as a result of the Redondo Beach via Playa Del Rey streetcar line that was established in 1902 from Culver City to the new beach resort of Playa Del Rey. 

Well into the 1950s, Del Rey was centered around market gardens. Summer celery was a successful crop. 

The old streetcar/freight line was redeveloped into Culver Boulevard Median Bike Path in the 1990s.

Population
The 2000 U.S. census counted 28,010 residents in the 2.45-square-mile Del Rey neighborhood—an average of 11,420 people per square mile, about the norm for Los Angeles; in 2008, the city estimated that the population had increased to 32,976. The median age for residents was 35, considered the average for Los Angeles; the percentage of residents aged 19 through 34 was among the county's highest.

The neighborhood was highly diverse ethnically. The breakdown was Latinos, 44.3%; whites, 34.0%; Asians, 14.1%; blacks, 4.4%,  and others, 3.2%.  Mexico (53.3%) and the Philippines (7.0%) were the most common places of birth for the 37.9% of the residents who were born abroad—about an average figure for Los Angeles. Since its inception, the neighborhood has been home to large communities of Mexican-American and Japanese-American residents. This was noted in Federal Housing Administration Redlining plans in the 1930s, which gave the neighborhood a low rating due to the lack of enforced racial segregation. Many residents of Japanese descent were forced to leave as part of the Internment of Japanese Americans during World War II. A monument has been installed on the corner of Venice and Lincoln Boulevards in nearby Venice, where Japanese residents were ordered to board buses to the internment camps.

The median yearly household income in 2008 dollars was $62,259, an average figure for Los Angeles. The average household size of 2.5 people was about the same as the city as a whole. Renters occupied 55.2% of the housing stock and house- or apartment owners held 44.8%.

The percentages of never-married men (42.9%) and divorced women (12.7%) were among the county's highest. In 2000, there were 1,846 veterans, or 8.4%, a high rate for Los Angeles.

Police service
The Los Angeles Police Department operates the Pacific Community Police Station at 12312 Culver Boulevard, 90066, serving the neighborhood as well as Westchester and Venice.

Fire service 
Del Rey is served by the Los Angeles Fire Department. Station 67 is located within Del Rey on Playa Vista Drive. Parts of Del Rey are also served by LAFD Station 63 (Venice) and Station 62 (Mar Vista).

Education

Thirty percent of Del Rey residents aged 25 and older had earned a four-year degree by 2000, an average figure for both the city and the county.

The schools within Del Rey are as follows:

 Culver City Christian School, private elementary, 11312 Washington Boulevard
 Stoner Avenue Elementary School, LAUSD, 11735 Braddock Drive
 ICEF Vista Elementary Academy, charter school, 4471 Inglewood Boulevard
 Braddock Drive Elementary School, LAUSD, 4711 Inglewood Boulevard
 Short Avenue Elementary School, LAUSD, 12814 Maxella Avenue
 Marina del Rey Middle School, LAUSD, 12500 Braddock Drive
 Ocean Charter School, charter elementary, 12606 Culver Boulevard
 Goethe International Charter School, charter elementary, 12500 Braddock Drive

References and notes

External links
 Del Rey Neighborhood Council
 Del Rey Residents Association
  Del Rey crime map and statistics

Del Rey, Los Angeles
Neighborhoods in Los Angeles
Westside (Los Angeles County)